Aethosoma is a genus of mites in the family Macrochelidae. Aethosoma burchellestes is a myrmecophile and has been found near colonies of army ants.

References

Macrochelidae
Articles created by Qbugbot